Erosi Manjgaladze (March 3, 1925 – January 26, 1982) was a renowned Georgian theatre and film actor who played lead roles in some of the most popular Soviet films, such as The Wishing Tree, Melodies of Vera Quarter, Londre, Kvevri and A Necklace for My Beloved. Manjgaladze was also a popular sport commentator of football matches. For his contribution to the Soviet cinematography and performing arts Manjgaladze received the honorary titles of the People's Artist of the USSR and People's Artist of Georgia.

Biography
Manjgaladze was born in Samtredia, Georgian SSR in 1925. In 1945, while studying at the Theatre and Film Academy, the theater director Georgy Tovstonogov invited Manjgaladze to Griboedov Theater to play the role of Pripitkin in Maxim Gorky's  the Barbarian. His talent was quickly recognized by the famous Rustaveli Theatre where he was invited to join its theatrical troupe of well known acting stars like Akaki Khorava, Ramaz Chkhikvadze, and Medea Chakhava. The production of Gabriel Sundukian's well-known play Pepo  where Manjgaladze played the role of cunning trader Arutin Kirakozovich Zimzimov in the duet with actress Medea Chakhava (who played the role of Shushan) would become one of the most celebrated theatrical performances of the time and earn him the recognition of an exceptional actor. Manjgaladze's notable theatrical roles included King Oedipus, Khanuma (Count Vano Pantiashvili), and in the Caucasian Chalk Circle (Azdav). He also performed in famous theater houses of Marjanishvili and Tumanishvili theaters working with legendary directors such as Mikheil Tumanishvili.

Manjgaladze possessed one of the best-known voices in theater, a gripping tone of basso profondo  which lend him to voice-over roles, voice acting in numerous films and career as the sports commentator of live football matches. His radio broadcasts of news reports from the frontlines during the WWII has earned him the nom de guerre of "Georgian leviathan." His majestic voice in combination with emotional and energetic real time commentary of football matches made him as an iconic sports commentator in the Soviet Union. According to the renowned Georgian actress Medea Chakhava: 

In film and theater Manjgaladze was known for his unique way of improvisation and impromptu inventing new lines during the live performances on the stage. His role as police chief Samchkuashvili in 1970 satirical comedy Kvevri became one of the most loved films in Georgia. His extraordinary performance as Bumbula in 1976 film the Wishing Tree received high praise among the film critics. On January 26, 1981, Manjgaladze died from the sudden heart attack in his Tbilisi apartment.

Filmography 
 1978 Kojris tkis sizmrebi (Short) (voice, as Erosi Mandjgaladze)
 1978 Kvarkvare
 1978 Small Town of Anara
 1976 The Wishing Tree
 1976 Namdvili tbiliselebi da skhvebi (voice)
 1976 Termometri (Short)
 1975 Kibe (Short)
 1974 Gamis viziti (TV Movie)
 1973 Me da chemi mezoblebi (TV Movie)
 1973 Melodies of the Vera Quarter
 1972 Stealing the Moon
 1971 A Necklace for My Beloved
 1970 Kvevri (Short)
 1969 Didedebi da shvilishvilebi
 1967 Chemi megobari Nodari
 1967 Vigatsas avtobusze agviandeba
 1966 Londre
 1966 Meeting with the past
 1965 Bodishi, tkven gelit sikvdili
 1963 Tojinebi itsinian
 1961 Chiakokona
 1960 Mkhiaruli sastumro (TV Movie)
 1959 Tsarsuli zapkhuli
 1957 Mozart da Salieri (TV Movie)

Theater roles
 Vladimer Sokolov, "Great Ruler" (Ivan the Great)
 Gabriel Sundukian, "Pepo" (Zimzimov)
 John Fletcher and Philip Mesinger, Spanish POriest (Lopez)
 Polikarpe Kakabadze, "Khvarkhvare" (Khvarkhvare)
 Leo Kiacheli, "Gvadi Bigva" (Gvadi)
 Sophocles, "King Oedipus" (King Oedipus)
 Giorgi Nakhutsrishvili "Chinchraka" (Bear)
 Avksenti Tsagareli, "Khanuma" (Count Vano Pantiashvili)
 Bertolt Brecht, "The Caucasian Chalk Circle" (Azdav)
 Julius Fuchik, "People, be Vigilant!" (Peshek)
 Viktor Rozov "Before Dinner" (Aleksandre)
 Alexander Isaakovich Gelman, "We, the undersigned" (Yuri Deviatov)

See also
 Marjanishvili Theatre
 Cinema of Georgia

References

External links
 
 Erosi Manjgaladze's Biography on Georgian National Cinema
  Manjgaladze's Biography on the National Museum of the Parliament of Georgia
  Documentary Film on Erosi Manjgaladze by the Georgian Public Broadcaster

1925 births
1982 deaths
Burials at Didube Pantheon
20th-century male actors from Georgia (country)
People's Artists of Georgia
Actors from Tbilisi
Film people from Tbilisi
Theatre people from Tbilisi
Male film actors from Georgia (country)